was a Japanese football player. He played for Japan national team.

Club career
Ono was born in Kanagawa Prefecture on March 2, 1923. After graduating from University of Tokyo, he joined Nissan Chemical. He also played for University of Tokyo LB was consisted of his alma mater University of Tokyo players and graduates. At University of Tokyo LB, he won 1949 Emperor's Cup with Ko Arima and so on.

National team career
In March 1954, Ono was selected Japan national team for 1954 World Cup qualification. At this qualification, on March 14, he debuted against South Korea. He also played at 1954 Asian Games. He played 3 games for Japan in 1954.

On February 11, 2001, Ono died of ruptured aneurysm of abdomen at the age of 77.

National team statistics

References

External links
 
 Japan National Football Team Database

1923 births
2001 deaths
University of Tokyo alumni
Association football people from Kanagawa Prefecture
Japanese footballers
Japan international footballers
Footballers at the 1954 Asian Games
Association football midfielders
Asian Games competitors for Japan